France produces many different kind of rums in several different locations. Most of the rums are cane juice rums or rhum agricoles. The different distilleries are located in the French oversea departments and territories of La Réunion, Guadeloupe, French Guiana, Martinique and Saint Barthélemy. Martinique is, by far, the French island that has the most rum distilleries and brands. Below is a list of French rum distillers and brands organized by location.

Metropolitan France
Negrita (rum)
BOWS Distillery
Distillery O'Baptiste
Distillery Coqlicorne
Distillery Castan
Distillery Moon Harbour
Distillery ERIKA

Guadeloupe

Bologne (rum)
Damoiseau (rum)
Montebello (rum)
Mon Repos (rum)
Longueteau (rum)
Père Labat (rum)
Séverin (rum)

French Guiana
Rhum Saint-Maurice

La Réunion

Rhum Charette
Riviere du Mat (rum)
Savanna (rum)
Tank Rum

Martinique

Rhum Clément
Rhum Dillon
Rhum du Père Labat
Rhum J.M.
Habitation Saint-Etienne
J. Bally
La Mauny
Neisson distillery
Rhum Depaz
Saint James (rum)
Trois Rivières (rum)

Saint Barthélemy
R. St Barth

See also
List of rum producers

References 

Rums